The 1974 Connecticut gubernatorial election was held on November 5, 1974. Democratic nominee Ella Grasso defeated Republican nominee Robert H. Steele with 58.35% of the vote. Grasso thus became the first woman to be elected Governor of Connecticut.

General election

Candidates
Major party candidates
Ella Grasso, Democratic
Robert H. Steele, Republican

Other candidates
Thomas J. Pallone, Independent
Allen C. Peichert, American

Results

References

1974
Connecticut
Gubernatorial